Ounianga Kébir is a town in the Sahara Desert in the Ennedi Region of northern Chad. Located within the Ennedi Department, Ounianga also makes up a sub-prefecture.

Transport
The town is served by Kébir Airport.

External links
Satellite map at Maplandia

Populated places in Chad
Ennedi-Ouest Region